Daguerre is a circular formation near the north end of Mare Nectaris. To the west-northwest is the crater Mädler, and beyond it to the west is the prominent Theophilus. To the north in the rugged continental area between the maria is Isidorus.

This feature has the appearance of a lunar impact crater that has been nearly submerged by a lava flow, leaving a gap in the southwest wall that gives the feature the shape of a horse-shoe. The floor is overlaid by the linear ray from Mädler. The maximum altitude of the surviving rim is 1.5 km.

The crater was named after French artist and photographer Louis Daguerre in 1935.

Satellite craters
By convention these features are identified on lunar maps by placing the letter on the side of the crater midpoint that is closest to Daguerre.

References

External links
 

Impact craters on the Moon